Ices is the third studio album by American singer Lia Ices. It was released on September 16, 2014, by Jagjaguwar Records.

Track listing

References

2014 albums
Jagjaguwar albums